The Autonomous Republic of Crimea, commonly known as Crimea, is an autonomous republic of Ukraine encompassing most of Crimea that was annexed by Russia in 2014. The Autonomous Republic of Crimea occupies most of the peninsula, while the City of Sevastopol (a city with special status within Ukraine) occupies the rest.

The Cimmerians, Bulgars, Greeks, Scythians, Goths, Huns, Khazars, the state of Kievan Rus', Byzantine Greeks, Kipchaks, Ottoman Turks, Golden Horde Tatars and the Mongols each controlled Crimea in its earlier history. In the 13th century, it was partly controlled by the Venetians and by the Genoese. They were followed by the Crimean Khanate and the Ottoman Empire in the 15th to 18th centuries, the Russian Empire in the 18th to 20th centuries, Germany during World War II, and the Russian Soviet Federative Socialist Republic, and later the Ukrainian Soviet Socialist Republic, within the Soviet Union during the rest of the 20th century until Crimea became part of independent Ukraine with the breakup of the Soviet Union in 1991.

Following the February 2014 Ukrainian revolution that ousted Ukrainian president Viktor Yanukovych, pro-Russian separatists and Russian troops took control of the territory. A controversial Crimea-wide referendum was held on the issue of becoming part of Russia, which, according to the official results, was supported by the overwhelming majority of Crimeans who voted. Russia formally annexed Crimea on 18 March 2014, incorporating the Republic of Crimea and the federal city of Sevastopol as the 84th and 85th federal subjects of Russia. While Russia and 17 other UN member states recognize Crimea as part of the Russian Federation, Ukraine continues to claim Crimea as an integral part of its territory, supported by most foreign governments and United Nations General Assembly Resolution 68/262.

The Autonomous Republic of Crimea is an autonomous parliamentary republic within Ukraine and is governed by the Constitution of Crimea in accordance with the laws of Ukraine. The capital and administrative seat of the republic's government is the city of Simferopol, located in the centre of the peninsula. These figures do not include the area and population of the City of Sevastopol (2007 population: 379,200), which is administratively separate from the autonomous republic. The peninsula thus has 2,352,385 people (2007 estimate).

Crimean Tatars, a predominantly Muslim ethnic minority who in 2001 made up 12.10% of the population, formed in Crimea in the late Middle Ages, after the Crimean Khanate had come into existence. The Crimean Tatars were forcibly expelled to Central Asia by Joseph Stalin's government. After the fall of the Soviet Union, Crimean Tatars began to return to the region. According to the 2001 Ukrainian population census 58% of the population of Crimea are ethnic Russians and 24% are ethnic Ukrainians. The region has the highest proportion of Muslims in Ukraine.

Background

Since 1954, Crimea Oblast has been administratively part of the Ukrainian SSR. Shortly prior to the dissolution of the Soviet Union, Crimea was granted the status of Autonomous Republic by the Supreme Soviet of the Ukrainian SSR following a state-sanctioned referendum held on January 20, 1991. When Ukraine became independent, Crimea remained a republic within the country, leading to tensions between Russia and Ukraine as the Black Sea Fleet was based on the peninsula.

History

Post-Soviet years
Since Ukrainian independence, more than 250,000 Crimean Tatars have returned and integrated into the region.

Between 1992-1995, a struggle about the division of powers between the Crimean and Ukrainian authorities ensued. On 26 February, the Crimean parliament renamed the ASSR the Republic of Crimea. Then on 5 May, it proclaimed self-government and twice enacted constitutions that the Ukrainian government and Parliament refused to accept on the grounds that it was inconsistent with Ukraine's constitution. Finally in June 1992, the parties reached a compromise: Crimea would be given the status of "autonomous republic" and granted special economic status, as an autonomous but integral part of Ukraine. 

In October 1993, the Crimean parliament established the post of president of Crimea. Tensions rose in 1994 with election of separatist leader Yury Meshkov as Crimean president. On 17 March 1995, the parliament of Ukraine abolished the Crimean constitution of 1992, all the laws and decrees contradicting those of Kyiv, and also removed Yuriy Meshkov, the then president of Crimea, along with the office itself. After an interim constitution, the 1998 Constitution of the Autonomous Republic of Crimea was put into effect, changing the territory's name to the Autonomous Republic of Crimea.

Formation of the autonomous republic
Following the ratification of the May 1997 Russian–Ukrainian Friendship Treaty, in which Russia recognized Ukraine's borders and sovereignty over Crimea, international tensions slowly eased. However, in 2006, anti-NATO protests broke out on the peninsula. In September 2008, the Ukrainian foreign minister Volodymyr Ohryzko accused Russia of giving out Russian passports to the population in Crimea and described it as a "real problem" given Russia's declared policy of military intervention abroad to protect Russian citizens.

On 24 August 2009, anti-Ukrainian demonstrations were held in Crimea by ethnic Russian residents. Sergei Tsekov (of the Russian Bloc and then deputy speaker of the Crimean parliament) said then that he hoped that Russia would treat Crimea the same way as it had treated South Ossetia and Abkhazia. The 2010 Ukrainian–Russian Naval Base for Natural Gas treaty extended Russia's lease on naval facilities in Crimea until 2042, with optional five-year renewals.

Occupation and annexation by Russia 

Crimea voted strongly for the pro-Russian Ukrainian president Viktor Yanukovych and his Party of Regions in presidential and parliamentary elections, and his ousting on 22 February 2014 during the 2014 Ukrainian revolution was followed by a push by pro-Russian protesters for Crimea to secede from Ukraine and seek assistance from Russia. Four days later, thousands of pro-Russian and pro-Ukraine protesters clashed in front of the parliament building in Simferopol.

On 28 February 2014, Russian forces occupied airports and other strategic locations in Crimea though the Russian foreign ministry stated that "movement of the Black Sea Fleet armored vehicles in Crimea (...) happens in full accordance with basic Russian-Ukrainian agreements on the Black Sea Fleet". Gunmen, either armed militants or Russian special forces, occupied the Crimean parliament and, under armed guard with doors locked, members of parliament elected Sergey Aksyonov as the new Crimean prime minister. Aksyonov then said that he asserted sole control over Crimea's security forces and appealed to Russia "for assistance in guaranteeing peace and calmness" on the peninsula. The interim government of Ukraine described events as an invasion and occupation and did not recognize the Aksyonov administration as legal. Ousted Ukrainian president Viktor Yanukovych sent a letter to Putin asking him to use military force in Ukraine to restore law and order. On 1 March, the Russian parliament granted president Vladimir Putin the authority to use such force. Three days later, several Ukrainian bases and navy ships in Crimea reported being intimidated by Russian forces and Ukrainian warships were also effectively blockaded in Sevastopol.

On 6 March, the Crimean parliament asked the Russian government for the region to become a subject of the Russian Federation with a Crimea-wide referendum on the issue set for 16 March. The Ukrainian government, the European Union, and the US all challenged the legitimacy of the request and of the proposed referendum as article 73 of the constitution of Ukraine states: "Alterations to the territory of Ukraine shall be resolved exclusively by an all-Ukrainian referendum." International monitors arrived in Ukraine to assess the situation but were halted by armed militants at the Crimean border.

The day before the referendum, Ukraine's national parliament voted to dissolve the Supreme Council of Crimea as its pro-Moscow leaders were finalising preparations for the vote.

The 16 March referendum required voters to choose between "Do you support rejoining Crimea with Russia as a subject of the Russian Federation?" and "Do you support restoration of the 1992 Constitution of the Autonomous Republic of Crimea and Crimea's status as a part of Ukraine?" There was no option on the ballot to maintain the status quo. However, support for the second question would have restored the republic's autonomous status within Ukraine. The official turnout for the referendum was 83%, and the overwhelming majority of those who voted (95.5%) supported the option of rejoining Russia. However, a BBC reporter claimed that a huge number of Tatars and Ukrainians had abstained from the vote.

Following the referendum, the members of the Supreme Council voted to rename themselves the State Council of the Republic of Crimea and also formally appealed to Russia to accept Crimea as part of the Russian Federation. This was granted and on 18 March 2014 the self-proclaimed Republic of Crimea signed a treaty of accession to the Russian Federation though the accession was granted separately for each of the former regions that composed it: one accession for the Republic of Crimea, and another for Sevastopol as a federal city. On 24 March 2014 the Ukrainian government ordered the full withdrawal of all of its armed forces from Crimea and two days later the last Ukrainian military bases and Ukrainian navy ships were captured by Russian troops.

Ukraine, meanwhile, continues to claim Crimea as its territory and in 2015 the Ukrainian parliament designated 20 February 2014 as the (official) date of the start of "the temporary occupation of Crimea." On 27 March 2014 100 United Nations member states voted for United Nations General Assembly Resolution 68/262 affirming the General Assembly's commitment to the territorial integrity of Ukraine within its internationally recognized borders  while 11 member states voted against, 58 abstained and 24 member states absented. Since then six countries (Cuba, Nicaragua, Venezuela, Syria, Afghanistan, and North Korea) have publicly recognized Russia's annexation of Crimea while others have stated support for the 16 March 2014 Crimean referendum.

Government and administration

Executive power in the Autonomous Republic of Crimea was exercised by the Council of Ministers of Crimea, headed by a Chairman, appointed and dismissed by the Supreme Council of Crimea, with the consent of the President of Ukraine. Though not an official body, the Mejlis of the Crimean Tatar People could address grievances to the Ukrainian central government, the Crimean government, and international bodies.

The Autonomous Republic of Crimea had 25 administrative areas: 14 raions (districts) and 11 mis'kradas and mistos (city municipalities), officially known as territories governed by city councils. 

Major centres of urban development:

An administrative reform, enacted by the Verkhovna Rada on 17 July 2020, envisages redivision of the Autonomous Republic of Crimea into 10 enlarged raions (districts), into which cities (municipalities) of republican significance will be absorbed. Delayed until return of the peninsula under Ukrainian control, the reform envisages the following subdivision of the republic:

Bakhchysarai Raion — composed of Bakhchysarai Raion and parts of territory that earlier was subordinated to the Sevastopol municipality (without the Sevastopol city proper and also without Balaklava as such that exists within the Sevastopol city limits within the framework of Ukrainian legislation),
Bilohirsk Raion — composed of Bilohirsk and Nyzhniohirsk raions,
Dzhankoi Raion — composed of Dzhankoi Raion and former Dzhankoi municipality,
Yevpatoria Raion — composed of Saky and Chornomorske raions and former Yevpatoria and Saky municipalities, 
Kerch Raion — composed of Lenine Raion and former Kerch municipality, 
Kurman Raion — composed of Krasnohvardiysky and Pervomaisk raions,
Perekop Raion (Or ) — composed of Krasnoperekopsk and Rozdolne raions, former Armiansk and Krasnoperekopsk municipalities,
Simferopol Raion — composed of Simferopol Raion and former Simferopol municipality, 
Feodosia Raion — composed of Kirovske and Sovietskyi raions, former Feodosia and Sudak municipalities, 
Yalta Raion — composed of former Yalta and Alushta municipalities.

See also

Crimean Peninsula
Political status of Crimea
Presidential representative of Ukraine in Crimea

Notes

References

Further reading
 
 Alexeenko A.O., Balyshev M.A. (2017). Scientific and technical documentation on the economic situation of the Crimean region in the Ukrainian Soviet Socialist Republic (1954-1991) (review of sources from the funds of the Central State Scientific and Technical Archive of Ukraine). Archives of Ukraine, 2. P.103-113. (In Ukrainian)

External links

Official
 www.ppu.gov.ua, website of the Presidential Representative in the Autonomous Republic of Crimea 
 ark.gp.gov.ua, website of the Prosecutor's Office of the Autonomous Republic of Crimea 

Historical
 www.rada.crimea.ua, website of the Supreme Council of the Autonomous Republic of Crimea 
 Series about the recent political history of Crimea by the Independent Analytical Centre for Geopolitical Studies "Borysfen Intel"

Politics of Crimea
Autonomous republics of Ukraine
Disputed territories in Europe
Subdivisions of Ukraine
States and territories established in 1991
Autonomous governments in exile
Republics
Ukrainian territories claimed by Russia